Crab Run may refer to:

Crab Run (Mahanoy Creek), Pennsylvania
Crab Run (West Virginia)